Ulhas Yeshwant Tuenkar is an Indian politician from Goa and a member of the Goa Legislative Assembly. Tuenkar won the Navelim Assembly constituency on the Bharatiya Janata Party ticket in the 2022 Goa Legislative Assembly election. Tuenkar defecated Valanka Alemao of All India Trinamool Congress by 430 votes.

References

1968 births
Living people
Goa MLAs 2022–2027
Bharatiya Janata Party politicians from Goa
People from South Goa district